Domenico Ginnasi (19 June 1550 in Castel Bolognese – 12 March 1639, in Rome) was a Cardinal of the Roman Catholic church created by Pope Clement VIII.

Biography 
Ginnasi was born the third of seven children to Francesco Ginnasi, a Papal archivist, and his wife, Caterina Pallantieri. One of his younger brothers, Achille Ginnasi (1553-1594), served as Apostolic Protonotary, nominated in 1593, as governor of the County of Castel Bolognese by Clement VIII. In 1585–86, Domenico was nominated to be governor of the territory of Campagna, which now is mostly the province of Frosinone. Domenico was elected bishop of Manfredonia (1587-1600) in the consistory of 14 June 1587 held by Pope Sixtus V. In Manfredonia, he founded in 1592 the Monastery of St Clair and institutes a Seminary. He next served as Apostolic Nuncio to Spain.

Pope Clement elevated him to Cardinal on 9 June 1604. It is said that Domenico ministered the viaticum to a dying Camillus de Lellis on 2 July 1614. Camillus was beatified in 1742. In 1630, Domenico reconstructed the medieval church of Santa Lucia alle Botteghe Oscure that stood nearby his family Palace in Central Rome. The church was decorated with canvases by his niece, Caterina Ginnasi. He died age of 88 from an attack of gout, and was buried in this church.

References

External links 
 Biography

1550 births
1639 deaths
17th-century Italian cardinals
People from the Province of Ravenna
Apostolic Nuncios to Spain
Apostolic Nuncios to the Republic of Florence